Cymindis axillaris is a species of ground beetle in the subfamily Harpalinae. It was described by Johan Christian Fabricius in 1794.

References

axillaris
Beetles described in 1794